Saint Magnus of Oderzo was a 7th-century Italian saint who is notable for founding some of the earliest churches in Venice. He was Bishop of Oderzo and travelled to Venice where he founded the churches of Santi Apostoli, San Pietro di Castello, Santa Maria Formosa, Santa Giustina, San Giovanni in Bragora, San Zaccaria, San Salvador and Angelo Raffaele.

He died in 670 and his remains are reportedly buried in the church of San Geremia in Venice.

References

670 deaths
7th-century Italian bishops
Italian saints